Babang luksa may refer to:

 A Filipino funeral custom that takes place on the first anniversary of a death
 Babang Luksa (film), a 2011 Filipino film